Kandalakshskoye Rural Community was an administrative division (a rural community) of Kemsky Uyezd of Arkhangelsk Governorate of the Russian Empire, which existed in 1861–1866.

The rural community had the same rights as the volosts in other uyezds.

As of the time of its creation, it included the settlements of Kandalaksha, Knyazhaya Guba, and Kovda.

In 1866, the rural community was transformed into Kovdskaya Volost.

References

Notes

Sources

Rural communities of the Russian Empire
States and territories established in 1861
1866 disestablishments
1861 establishments in the Russian Empire